The 2014–15 High Point Panthers men's basketball team represented High Point University during the 2014–15 NCAA Division I men's basketball season. The Panthers, led by sixth year head coach Scott Cherry, played their home games at the Millis Athletic Convocation Center and were members of the Big South Conference. They finished the season 23–10, 13–5 in Big South play to finish in a tie for the Big South regular season championship. They lost in the quarterfinals of the Big South tournament to Gardner–Webb. They were invited to the CollegeInsider.com Tournament where they defeated Maryland Eastern Shore in the first round before losing in the second round to Eastern Kentucky.

Roster

Schedule

|-
!colspan=9 style="background:#4F007D; color:#ffffff;"| Regular season

|-
!colspan=9 style="background:#4F007D; color:#ffffff;"|Big South tournament

|-
!colspan=9 style="background:#4F007D; color:#ffffff;"|CIT

References

High Point Panthers men's basketball seasons
High Point
High Point